Over There is an Australian television drama adventure series which first screened on the ABC in 1972 to 1973.

Cast
 Judy Morris as Elizabeth Kirby
 John Meillon as Cyril Kirby
 John Hargreaves as Robert Kirby
 Serge Lazareff
 Peter Sumner
 Rod Mullinar as Tom Bowden
 Jack Thompson as Corporal Harry Logan
 Nick Tate
 Anne Haddy		
 Garry McDonald	
 Richard Lupino	
 Ben Gabrieles
 Ken Goodlet		
 Nigel Lovell

References

External links
Over There at Classic Australian TV

Australian Broadcasting Corporation original programming
1972 Australian television series debuts
1973 Australian television series endings
Australian drama television series
English-language television shows